Liar is the second studio album by South Korean entertainer Harisu, released on October 28, 2002. Musically similar to her first album, Temptation, Harisu describes Liar as being "very Euro/techno/house... a high-energy dance record with a very upbeat rhythm." A music video was filmed for the album's title track.

Liar peaked at #23 on the MIAK K-pop albums chart, selling 15,760 copies in its first month of release.

Track listing 
 "Prologue" – 1:23
 "Asura" – 3:09
 "Angel Eyes" – 3:55
 "Liar" – 3:33
 "Chapter" – 0:28
 "Emotion" – 3:54
 "Red" – 3:49
 "Go Away" – 3:58
 "Chapter" – 0:34
 "Ending" – 3:43
 "Happy My Life" – 3:54
 "Catch Me" – 3:44
 "Trust of My Heart" – 3:55
 "Asura" (remix) – 3:09
 "Happy My Life" (remix) – 3:48

Notes and references 

2002 albums
Harisu albums